Istrouma is an unincorporated community in East Baton Rouge Parish, Louisiana, United States.

Etymology
It is speculated that the name of the community is derived from the Choctaw words 'ita humma' which means 'red pole' in the Choctaw language.

Red Pole
On March 17, 1699 Pierre Le Moyne d'Iberville described the red maypole that he found in the area:

References

Unincorporated communities in East Baton Rouge Parish, Louisiana
Unincorporated communities in Louisiana